Paroster bulbus is water beetle in the Hydroporini tribe of the subfamily Hydroporinae  in the Dytiscidae family. It was first described by Chris Watts and William Humphreys in 2004 as Nirripirti bulbus. It was transferred to the genus, Paroster, in 2008 by Remko Leijs and Chris Watts.

It is known only from the type locality in Western Australia.

References

Beetles described in 2004